John Carlin may refer to:
 John Carlin (actor) (1929–2017), Scottish actor
 John Carlin (businessman) (born 1955), American entrepreneur, art historian and record producer
 John Carlin (footballer) (1878–1935), English footballer for Liverpool F.C.
 John Carlin (journalist) (born 1956), journalist and author
 John Carlin (umpire) (1861–1944), cricketer and test umpire
 John Carlin (professor), Australian statistician
 John P. Carlin, Assistant Attorney General for Justice National Security Division
 John W. Carlin (born 1940), governor of Kansas, 1979–1987, and Archivist of the United States, 1995–2005

See also
 John Carling (1828–1911), politician
 John R. Carling, writer